Jacopo Alessandro Calvi (23 February 1740 – 15 May 1815) was an Italian painter and art critic who painted sacred and historical subjects in a late-Baroque style.

Biography
He was born in Bologna. He became deaf at the age of eight years, and due to his short stature, he was nicknamed il Sordino. He trained with Giuseppe Varotti and later with Giampietro Cavazzoni Zanotti, from whom he also learned poetry. Among Calvi's writing are:
Verses and Prose in quarto about a series of paintings owned by the Marquis Filippo Hercolani. Bologna 1780. 
La Certosa di Bologna descritta nelle sue pitture. Bologna 1793 by Luigi Crespi in 1772; with notes and corrections by Calvi.
Notizie della vita e delle opere del Cav. Gian Francesco Barbieri, detto il Guercino da Cento. Bologna 1808. 
Memorie della vita e delle opere di Francesco Raibolini, detto il Francia. Bologna 1812.

Calvi painted in the cloister of the church of San Michele in Bosco and the Church of Sant'Agostino, Ferrara. Anna Mignani was one of his pupils. He died in Bologna.

References

1740 births
1815 deaths
18th-century Italian painters
Italian male painters
19th-century Italian painters
Italian art historians
Painters from Bologna
19th-century Italian male artists
18th-century Italian male artists